Air Corridor was an airline based in Nampula, Mozambique. It operated domestic services. Its main base was Nampula Airport. Air Corridor ceased operations on 10 January 2008.

History 

The airline was established in 2004 and began operations in August 2004 with a single Boeing 737. It was privately owned. Due to safety concerns, United States Government personnel were initially prohibited from using this carrier, a ban that was lifted on 9 February 2007.

Destinations 

Air Corridor operated services to the following domestic scheduled destinations (at March 2007): Beira, Tete, Lichinga, Maputo, Nampula, Pemba and Quelimane.

Fleet 
The Air Corridor fleet consisted of the following aircraft (at April 2008):

 2 Boeing 737-200

References

Airlines established in 2004
Airlines disestablished in 2008
Defunct airlines of Mozambique